Yevgeni Aleksandrovich Saprykin (born 18 April 1970; died in January 2015) was a Russian professional football player.

Club career
He played 1 game in the UEFA Cup 1993–94 for FC Spartak Vladikavkaz.

External links
 

1970 births
Sportspeople from Donetsk
2015 deaths
Soviet footballers
Association football forwards
Russian footballers
FC Elista players
FC Spartak-UGP Anapa players
FC Spartak Vladikavkaz players
FC Metalurh Zaporizhzhia players
FC Zorya Luhansk players
FK Ventspils players
FC Tiraspol players
Russian Premier League players
Ukrainian Premier League players
Ukrainian First League players
Latvian Higher League players
Moldovan Super Liga players
Russian expatriate footballers
Expatriate footballers in Ukraine
Expatriate footballers in Latvia
Expatriate footballers in Moldova